The 1843 Michigan gubernatorial election was held from November 6, 1843 to November 7, 1843. Incumbent Democrat John S. Barry defeated Whig nominee Zina Pitcher with 54.76% of the vote.

General election

Candidates
Major party candidates
John S. Barry, Democratic
Zina Pitcher, Whig
Other candidates
James G. Birney, Liberty

Results

References

1843
Michigan
Gubernatorial
November 1843 events